A - B - C - D - E - F - G - H - I - J - K - L - M - N - O - P - Q - R - S - T - U - V - W - XYZ

This is a list of rivers in the United States that have names starting with the letter B.  For the main page, which includes links to listings by state, see List of rivers in the United States.

Ba 
Back Creek - Virginia, West Virginia
Back River - New Hampshire, Massachusetts
Bad River - South Dakota
Bad River - Wisconsin
Bad Axe River - Wisconsin
Baker River - New Hampshire
Baker River - Washington
Baker Brook River - Vermont
Bald River - Tennessee
Bald Eagle Creek - Pennsylvania
Ballona Creek - California
Ballston Creek - New York
Banister River - Virginia
Baraboo River - Wisconsin
Baranof River - Alaska
Bark River - Michigan
Bark River - Wisconsin (tributary of Lake Superior)
Bark River - Wisconsin (tributary of Rock River)
Barkers Creek - West Virginia
Barnes Creek - Washington
Barnes Creek - Wisconsin
Barren Fork - Tennessee
Barren River - Kentucky
Barrington River - Rhode Island
Barton Creek - Texas
Barton River - Vermont
Bass River - Massachusetts
Bass River - New Jersey
Bates Old River -South Carolina
Batsto River - New Jersey
Batten Kill - Vermont, New York
Battle Creek River - Michigan
Baudette River - Minnesota
Baugh Creek - Idaho
Bayou des Arc - Arkansas
Bayou des Cannes - Louisiana
Bayou Macon - Arkansas, Louisiana
Bayou Manchac - Louisiana
Bayou Nezpique - Louisiana
Bayou Plaquemine Brule - Louisiana
Bayou Queue de Tortue - Louisiana
Bayou Teche - Louisiana
Bayou Wikoff - Louisiana

Be 
Bean River - New Hampshire
Bear Creek - Alabama
Bear Creek - Oregon
Bear River (Feather River tributary) - California
Bear River (Mokelumne River tributary) - California
Bear River - Michigan
Bear River - Utah, Idaho, Wyoming
Bear River - Wisconsin
Bearcamp River - New Hampshire
Beaucoup Creek - Illinois
Beaver Brook - New Hampshire, Massachusetts
Beaver Creek - Alaska
Beaver Creek - Iowa
Beaver Kill River - New York
Beaver River - New York
Beaver River - Oklahoma
Beaver River - Pennsylvania
Beaver River - Rhode Island
Beaver Dam River - Wisconsin
Beaverhead River - Montana
Beebe River - New Hampshire
Beech Creek - Pennsylvania
Beech Fork - Kentucky (Beech Fork of the Salt River)
Beech River - New Hampshire
Beech River - Tennessee
Bellamy River - New Hampshire
Belle River - Michigan
Belle Fourche River - Wyoming, South Dakota
Belt Creek - Montana
Berrys River - New Hampshire
Betsie River - Michigan

Bi 
Big River - California
Big River - Missouri
Big River - New Hampshire
Big River - Oregon
Big River - Rhode Island
Big River - Wisconsin
Big Black River - Mississippi
Big Blue River - Indiana
Big Blue River - Nebraska, Kansas
Big Chico Creek - California
Big Coal River - West Virginia
Big Darby Creek - Ohio
Big Green River - Wisconsin
Big Hole River - Montana
Big Lost River - Idaho
Big Muddy Creek - Montana
Big Muddy River - Illinois
Big Pine Creek - Indiana
Big Rib River - Wisconsin
Big Quilcene River - Washington
Big Sandy Creek - Montana
Big Sandy Creek - West Virginia
Big Sandy River - Arizona
Big Sandy River - Kentucky, West Virginia
Big Sandy River - Tennessee
Big Sandy River - Wyoming
Big Sioux River - South Dakota, Iowa
Big South Fork of the Cumberland River - Tennessee, Kentucky
Big Sugar Creek - Missouri
Big Sur River - California
Big Thompson River - Colorado
Big Wood River - Idaho
Bighorn River - Wyoming, Montana
Bill Williams River - Arizona
Birch Creek - Alaska
Birch Creek - Montana
Birch River - West Virginia
Bitter Creek - Wyoming
Bitterroot River - Montana

Bl 
Black River - Arizona
Black River - Arkansas, Missouri
List of Michigan rivers named Black River
Black River - New Jersey
Black River - New York
Black River - North Carolina
Black River - Ohio
Black River - South Carolina
Black River - northern Vermont
Black River - southern Vermont
Black River - Washington (Chehalis River tributary)
Black River - Washington (Duwamish River tributary)
Black River - Wisconsin (tributary of Lake Michigan)
Black River - Wisconsin (tributary of Mississippi River)
Black River - Wisconsin (tributary of Nemadji River)
Black River - Wisconsin, Michigan
Black Butte River - California
Black Fork of the Cheat River - West Virginia
Black Fork Mohican River - Ohio
Black Lake Bayou - Louisiana
Black Mallard River - Michigan
Black Warrior River - Alabama
Blackbird Creek - Delaware
Blackfoot River - Idaho
Blackfoot River - Montana
Blacklick Creek - Ohio
Blacklick Creek - Pennsylvania
Blacks Fork of the Green River - Wyoming, Utah
Blackstone River - Massachusetts, Rhode Island
Blackwater River - Alabama
Blackwater River - Florida
Blackwater River - Maryland
Blackwater River - Massachusetts, New Hampshire
Blackwater River - Missouri
Blackwater River - New Hampshire
Blackwater River - Virginia
Blackwater River - West Virginia
Blanchard River - Ohio
Blanco River - Texas
Blood River - Tennessee, Kentucky
Blue River - Arizona
Blue River - Colorado
Blue River - Kansas, Missouri
Blue River - Oklahoma
Blue River - Oregon
Blue River - Wisconsin
Blue Earth River - Minnesota
Blueberry River - Minnesota
Bluestone River - Virginia, West Virginia

Bo 
Boardman River - Michigan
Boeuf River - Arkansas, Louisiana
Bog River - New York
Bogachiel River - Washington
Bogue Falaya River - Louisiana
Bohemia River - Delaware, Maryland
Bois Brule River - Wisconsin
Bois de Sioux River - Minnesota, South Dakota, North Dakota
Boise River - Idaho
Bonpas Creek - Illinois
Boone River - Iowa
Bosque River - Texas
Bouie River - Mississippi
Boulder River -  Montana (tributary of the Yellowstone River)
Boulder River - Montana (tributary of the Jefferson River)
Boulder River - Washington
Bouquet River - New York
Bourbeuse River - Missouri
Boyer River - Iowa

Br 
Braden River - Florida
Branch River - New Hampshire
Branch River - Rhode Island
Branch River - Wisconsin
Brandywine Creek (Broken Sword Creek) - Crawford County, Ohio
Brandywine Creek (Christina River) - Delaware, Pennsylvania
Brandywine Creek (Cuyahoga River) - Summit County, Ohio
Brays Bayou - Texas
Brazos River - Texas
Breitenbush River - Oregon
Bremner River - Alaska
Bridge Creek - Oregon
Brill River - Wisconsin
Broad River - Georgia
Broad River - North Carolina, northern South Carolina
Broad River - coastal South Carolina
Broadkill River - Delaware
Broglen River - Alabama
Brokenstraw Creek - New York, Pennsylvania
Bronx River - New York
Browns River - New Hampshire
Browns River - Vermont
Brule River - Michigan, Wisconsin
Bruneau River - Idaho
Brunet River - Wisconsin

Bu - By 
Buck Creek - Alabama
Buck Creek (Mississippi River) - Iowa
Buckeye Creek - West Virginia
Buckhannon River - West Virginia
Buckland River - Alaska
Buffalo Bayou - Texas
Buffalo Creek - Illinois
Buffalo Creek (Allegheny River) - Pennsylvania
Buffalo Creek (Juniata River) - Pennsylvania
Buffalo Creek (West Branch Susquehanna River) - Pennsylvania 
Buffalo Creek (Guyandotte River) - West Virginia
Buffalo Creek (Monongahela River) - West Virginia
Buffalo Creek (South Branch Potomac River) - West Virginia
Buffalo River - Arkansas
Buffalo River - Minnesota
Buffalo River - New York
Buffalo River - Tennessee
Buffalo River - Wisconsin
Bull River - West Virginia
Bull Run River  - Virginia
Bull Run River - Oregon
Bullpasture River - Virginia
Bully Creek - Oregon
Bumping River - Washington
Bumps River - Massachusetts
Bungay River - Massachusetts
Burnshirt River - Massachusetts
Burnt River - Oregon
Bush River - South Carolina
Buttahatchee River - Alabama, Mississippi
Butte Creek - California
Butte Creek - Oregon
Byram River - Connecticut, New York

B

roa-rup:Aradamatã cu arãuri ditu Vãsãliili Diadun ali Amerikia: B